

Isaac N. Sullivan (November 3, 1848 – January 31, 1938) was the first chief justice of the Idaho Supreme Court, serving alternately as associate justice from 1891 until 1917.

Early life and education
Sullivan was born in 1848 in Delaware County, Iowa, to parents Aaron and Jane (Lippincott) Sullivan. He was the fifth child in a family of nine children. He attended public school in Delaware County and later attended Adrian College in Michigan. From age 17 Sullivan taught school in Delaware County, and he was a school principal in Coffeyville, Kansas, 1872–1873.

Family
Sullivan married Christine Josephine Moore in 1870, and the marriage produced two sons, Willis Eugene Sullivan and Laverne Latimer Sullivan. Both of the Sullivan brothers graduated from Columbian University and became attorneys, later in practice with their father in the law firm of Sullivan and Sullivan.

Career
Sullivan read law with Judge J.M. Brayton in Delhi, Iowa, and he was admitted to practice law in Iowa in 1879. He moved to Idaho Territory in 1881, settling in Hailey, a community in the Wood River mining district, opening the firm of Angel & Sullivan.

Along with Joseph W. Huston and John T. Morgan, Sullivan won election to the Idaho Supreme Court in 1890, when Idaho became the 43rd state and held its first state election. Sullivan drew a two-year term, and he was appointed the first chief justice of the court. He later won reelection in 1892, 1898, 1904, and 1910. Sullivan retired from the court in 1917, replaced by John Campbell Rice. He later joined his family law practice, Sullivan & Sullivan.

Death
Sullivan died in Boise of a heart attack on January 31, 1938.

See also
 List of justices of the Idaho Supreme Court

Further reading
 Idaho Supreme Court Justice Sullivan … and Women's Suffrage, South Fork Companion, November 3, 2018

References

1848 births
1938 deaths
19th-century American judges
19th-century American lawyers
20th-century American judges
20th-century American lawyers
Justices of the Idaho Supreme Court
Adrian College alumni
Chief Justices of the Idaho Supreme Court